Scotty is a common nickname for a Scottish man, or for a Scottish Terrier dog.

Scotty may also refer to:

People

Given name or nickname
 Scotty Alcock (1885–1973), American baseball player
 Scotty Allan (1867–1941), American dog musher, businessman and politician
 Scotty Anderson (born 1979), American National Football League player
 Scotty Baesler (born 1941), American politician
 Scotty Bahrke (born 1985), American freestyle skier specializing in aerial skiing
 Scotty Barnhart (born 1964), American jazz trumpeter
 Scotty Barr (1886–1934), American baseball player
 Scotty Beckett (1929–1968), American actor
 Scotty Bierce (1896–1982), American National Football League player and coach
 Scotty Bloch (1925–2018), American actress
 Scotty Boman (born 1962), American politician
 Scotty Bowers (1923–2019), United States Marine and Hollywood pimp
 Scotty Bowman (born 1933), Canadian retired National Hockey League head coach
 Scotty Bowman (baseball) (1885–1912), American baseball player in the Negro leagues
 Ralph "Scotty" Bowman (1911–1990), Canadian ice hockey player
 Scotty Bozek (1950–2022), American épée fencer
 Scotty Cameron (ice hockey) (1921–1993), Canadian hockey player
 Scotty Campbell (born 1984), American politician
 Scotty Cannon, American dragster driver
 Scotty Cranmer (born 1987), American BMX rider
 Scotty Crockett (born 1979), American stock car racing driver
 Scotty Davidson (1891–1915), Canadian ice hockey player and soldier
 Scott Davis (Scotty D) (born 1975), American songwriter and producer
 Scotty Emerick (born 1973), American country music singer-songwriter
 Winston "Scotty" Fitzgerald (1914–1987), Canadian fiddler
 Scotty Fox, American pornographic film director
 Scotty Glacken (1944–2006), American football quarterback and college head coach
 Scotty Gomez (born 1979), American ice hockey player and coach
 Scotty Granger (born 1987), American singer-songwriter
 Maryscott (Scotty) Greenwood, American corporate director and specialist in Canada–U.S. relations
 Scotty Hamilton (1921–1976), American basketball player and coach
 Scotty Hard, Canadian producer and musician
 Scotty Holt, American jazz bassist
 Scotty Hopson (born 1989), American basketball player
 Scotty Ingerton (1886–1956), American baseball player
 Scotty Iseri (born 1979), American web series and mobile application creator and director
 Scotty James (born 1994), Australian snowboarder
 Scotty Jones (fl. 1911), American criminal and member of the Gas House Gang
 Scotty Kilmer (born 1953), American YouTuber and auto mechanic
 Scotty Klopfenstein, American musician and former member of Reel Big Fish
 Scotty Lago (born 1987), American snowboarder
 Scotty Leavenworth (born 1990), American actor
 Scotty Mattraw (1880–1946), American actor
 Scotty McClymont (1892–1974), New Zealand rugby league footballer
 Scotty McCreery (born 1993), American country music singer
 Scotty McGee (born 1986), American National Football League player
 Scotty McKnight (born 1988), American media executive and former National Football League player
 Scotty McLennan (born 1948), American Unitarian Universalist minister, lawyer and senior administrator at Stanford University
 Scotty Miller (born 1997), American National Football League player
 Scotty Moore (1931–2016), American guitarist, one of Elvis Presley's backing musicians
 Scotty Moorhead (1966–1997), American singer-songwriter and guitarist
 Scotty Morrison (born 1930), Canadian former National Hockey League referee
 Scotty Morrison (broadcaster) (born 1970), New Zealand broadcaster and academic
 Scotty Moylan (1916–2010), Guamanian businessman
 Scotty Munro (1917–1975), Canadian ice hockey coach
 Scotty Neill (1895–1963), American football and baseball player
 Scotty Nguyen (born 1962), Vietnamese-American poker player
 Scotty Olson (born 1968), Canadian boxer
 Scotty Pearson, New Zealand drummer and member of Elemeno P
 James "Scotty" Philip (1858–1911), American rancher and politician
 Scotty Pippen (born 1965), American basketball player
 Scotty Pippen Jr. (born 2000), American basketball player
 Scotty Plummer (c. 1961–1992), American banjoist
 Scotty Probasco (1928–2015), American heir, businessman and philanthropist
 Scotty Rankine (1909–1995), Canadian track and field athlete
 Scotty Ratliff (born 1943), American politician
 Scotty Reston (1909–1995), American journalist
 Scotty Robb (1908–1969), American baseball umpire
 Scotty Robertson (1930–2011), American basketball coach
 Scotty Sadzoute (born 1998), French association football player
 Scotty Schulhofer (1926–2006), American Hall of Fame Thoroughbred racehorse trainer
 Harold "Scotty" Scott, American soul singer and member of the Temprees
 Kermit Scott (musician) (died 2002), American jazz tenor saxophonist
 Wallace "Scotty" Scott, American rhythm and blues singer and member of the Whispers
 Scotty Smith (1845–1919), South African criminal
 Scotty Steagall (1929–2001), American basketball player
 Scotty Stirling (1928/1929–2015), American sports executive and sportswriter
 Scotty Stoneman (1932–1973), American bluegrass and country fiddler
 Scotty Thurman (born 1974), American basketball player and assistant coach
 Scotty Walden (born 1989), American football coach
 Scotty Washington (born 1997), American National Football League player
 Scotty Joe Weaver (1986–2004), American murder victim
 Scotty Whitelaw (1927–2016), American baseball and basketball coach
 Scotty Wilkins, American punk rock singer
 Scott Greene Wiseman (1908–1981), half of the Lulu Belle and Scotty country music act
 Scotty Wolfe (1908–1997), American Baptist minister

Surname
 Charmaine Scotty, Nauruan politician
 Elizabeth Scotty (born 2001), American tennis player
 Ludwig Scotty (born 1948), 10th President of Nauru

Stage or ring name
 Scotty (reggae vocalist) (1950–2003), Jamaican reggae singer born David Scott
 Scotty 2 Hotty, ring name of American firefighter and professional wrestler Scott Ronald Garland (born 1973)
 Scotty ATL (born 1985), American hip hop artist
 Scotty Boy, stage name of American DJ and record producer Scott Schroer
 Scotty Charisma, ring name of American professional wrestler Scott Wright (born 1977)
 Scotty Flamingo, ring name of American professional wrestler Scott Levy (born 1964)
 Scotty Goldman, ring name of American professional wrestler Scott Colton (born 1980)
 Scotty Mac, ring name of Canadian professional wrestler Scott Schnurr (born 1978)
 Scotty McGhee, ring name of British professional wrestler Garfield Portz (born 1959)
 Scotty Riggs, ring name of American professional wrestler Scott Antol (born 1971)
 Scotty T (born 1988), British reality TV personality born Scott Robert Timlin

Fictional characters
 Scotty (Star Trek), in the Star Trek universe
 Scotty Baldwin, on the American soap opera General Hospital and the spinoff Port Charles
 Scotty Grainger, on the American soap opera The Young and the Restless
 Hornet (Scotty McDowell), in the Marvel Universe
 Scotty Parker, the female main protagonist in the film Silent Scream
 Scotty Valens (Cold Case), on the American crime drama television series Cold Case
 Scotty Wandell, on the television series Brothers & Sisters
 Scotty Wilson, a recurring character in the American fantasy drama television series Highway to Heaven

Science
 Scotty (dinosaur), a nickname for the Tyrannosaurus rex fossil discovered in Saskatchewan, Canada in 1991

See also
 
 
 Scottie (disambiguation)
 Scoti, an old Irish tribe
 Scottee, entertainer and performance artist

Lists of people by nickname